Fresh Guacamole is a 2012 American animated short film written and directed by PES (Adam Pesapane). The film was nominated for Best Animated Short Film at the 85th Academy Awards; at 1 minute and 40 seconds, it is the shortest film ever nominated for an Oscar.

Distribution
After being nominated for an Academy Award the film was released along with all the other 15 Oscar-nominated short films in theaters by ShortsHD.

Overview
The film uses the technique of pixilation and shows a man's hands (the hands are from PES himself) making guacamole out of familiar objects, which become different items whenever they are cut, often depending on (unspoken) puns. For example, a baseball is cut in half and then becomes a pile of dice while it is being diced. Each of the objects also resembles an ingredient actually used in an authentic guacamole recipe - a grenade with a maroon number 7 billiard ball pit resembles an avocado and pit respectively, a baseball resembles an onion, a red pincushion resembles a tomato, a green miniature golf ball resembles a lime, a green Christmas light bulb (which is chopped into Monopoly game pieces/houses) resembles a jalapeño pepper, and king and queen chess pieces resemble salt & pepper shakers. The end result is "fresh guacamole" served with a side of "poker chips".

See also
2012 in film
Independent animation

References

External links

Fresh Guacamole on Official PES YouTube channel
Official site

2010s animated short films
2012 short films
2012 animated films
2012 films
Animated films without speech
American animated short films
Pixilation films
Stop-motion animated short films
2010s American films
2010s stop-motion animated films